Beinn a' Chaorainn (Mountain Of The Rowan Tree) is the name of two Munro mountains in the Scottish Highlands. It is also the name of several lesser mountains in Scotland.

Beinn a' Chaorainn (Cairngorms) Is situated in the middle of the Cairngorms range and has a height of 1083 metres
Beinn a' Chaorainn (Glen Spean) Lies on the northern side of Glen Spean and has a height of 1049 metres